Jo Bonney is an American theater director who has worked Off-Broadway, regionally and internationally, primarily focused on the development of new plays.

Early life and education 
Bonney was born in Australia. She attended Sydney University before transferring to Sydney College of the Arts (Grad. Fine Arts) and worked at The Australian Broadcasting Corporation.

Career 
Bonney moved to New York City in 1979. In the early 1980s, she co-directed two short films with Ruth Peyser, 'Another Great Day' (shown nationally on PBS) and 'Random Positions'. Bonney began her work in theater directing the solo work of her husband, Eric Bogosian. She has directed the premiere productions of over thirty plays – notably work by Bogosian, Lynn Nottage, Danny Hoch, Suzan-Lori Parks, Martina Majok, Neil LaBute, Naomi Wallace and José Rivera.
Bonney edited Extreme Exposure: An Anthology of Solo Performance Texts from the Twentieth Century (published in 2000 by TCG).

Awards and nominations 
Awards and nominations Bonney has received include:
 2019 Obie Award, Sustained Excellence of Direction
 2018 Lucille Lortel, Outstanding Director Nomination, Mlima's Tale
 2018 Outer Critics Circle, Outstanding Director Nomination, Cost of Living
 2018 Legends of Off-Broadway
 2014 Joseph Callaway Award (SDC)
 2013 Audelco Award, Father Comes Home from the Wars: Parts 1, 2 & 3
 2011 Drama Desk, Best Director nomination, By the Way, Meet Vera Stark
 2011 Lucille Lortel, Best Director nomination, By the Way, Meet Vera Stark
 2011 Lilly Award (Directing)
 2003 Lucille Lortel, Outstanding Director Best Revival, Fifth of July
 1998 Obie Award,  Sustained Excellence of Direction

Work

References 

American theatre directors
Women theatre directors
Obie Award recipients
Year of birth missing (living people)
Living people